Hapoel Eilat, for sponsorship reasons named Hapoel Yossi Avrahami Eilat, is an Israeli basketball club. The team plays in the Israeli Basketball Premier League, the top tier of Israeli basketball. The team represents the far-South region of the country - the Arabah area, and the Red Sea city of Eilat.

History
The team earned promotion to the First Division (known variously as Ligat HaAl, the Super League, or the Israeli Basketball Premier League) for the first time in the 1990–91 season, while being coached by Arik Shivek.

In the 1996–97 season, the team lost to Maccabi Tel Aviv in the playoff semi-finals. A year later the team reached the finals, in which it lost 0-3 to Maccabi Tel Aviv.

In early 2000, the team found itself in serious financial difficulties, which resulted in relegation to the Second Division (Liga Leumit, or the National League). Later the team disbanded, and re-established in the lowest league.

In the 2010–11 season, the team won the Association Cup, the cup of the lower leagues, after beating Maccabi Kiryat Bialik in the final.

In June 2012, the team gained the license of Habik'a B.C. to play in the Israeli Basketball Super League, starting with the 2012–13 season.

In June 2015, the team knocked out Israeli basketball powerhouse Maccabi Tel Aviv in the Israeli Basketball Premier League semi-finals, winning 3–2 in a best-of-five series. The team faced Hapoel Jerusalem in the finals, but lost.

Season by season

Source: Eurobasket.com

Players

Current roster

Depth chart

Honours

Domestic competitions

Israeli Championship
Runners-up: 1998, 2015
State Cup
Runners-up: 2014
League Cup
Runners-up: 2015, 2021

Lower division competitions
Liga Artzit  
Winners: 1991 
Association Cup
Champions (1): 2011

Notable players

 Shimon Amsalem
 Ari Rosenberg

Participation in Europe

 1993–1994: Korać Cup
 1994–1995: Korać Cup
 1997–1998: ULEB Eurocup
 1998–1999: Saporta Cup
Even though Eilat has constantly qualified for European basketball they choose not to participate due to financial difficulties.

Former managers 

 Israel Lev
 Ralf Klein
 Effi Birnbaum
 Sharon Drucker
 Arik Shivek
 Udi Segal
Moshe Weinkrantz

References

External links
Official Facebook page

Eilat
Basketball teams established in 1970
Eilat
Sport in Eilat
1970 establishments in Israel